National Highway 431 (NH 431) is a  National Highway in India.

It runs from Fatwah, south to Daniawan, South east to Negar Nausa, then to Chandi, then east through Chainpur and Belchhi, then north to Barh

References

National highways in India